Diana Sigei Chepkemoi (born 14 October 1987) is a Kenyan long-distance runner who competes in marathons and half marathons.

Chepkemoi was born in Kenya in 1987. Her husband Henry and his brother, Salim Kipsang, are both runners. She and her husband have a son and they live at Eldoret. Her coach is the retired Kenyan runner Patrick Sang and she is the only woman who trains in a group at Kaptagat near the Great Rift Valley in Kenya.

Career
In 2010, she took three first places at various distances in Austria, France and the Netherlands.
Chepkemoi came to further notice when she won sixth place at the Dubai Marathon and fourth place in the Toronto Marathon in 2011. She took second place in Amsterdam over ten miles in a time of 52:46, and second in Berlin over 25 kilometres.

In 2012, she was the runner up in both the Lisbon and Lille Half Marathons. She finished fourth in the Amsterdam Marathon and fifth in the Boston Marathon on a very hot day. In 2013, she was runner up in the Jakarta Marathon and she won the Lille half marathon.

References

1987 births
Living people
People from Uasin Gishu County
Kenyan female long-distance runners
Kenyan female marathon runners